Thor Henry Anderson (December 5, 1920 – September 5, 2005) was a college basketball coach and athletic director (AD). He was the head coach at Gonzaga University for 21 seasons, from 1951 to 1972, where he compiled a  record. He finished his career in college athletics as the AD at Northern Arizona University in Flagstaff.

Early years
Born in Milton-Freewater in eastern Oregon, Anderson graduated from Burns High School in Burns at age 16 in 1937, and then played college basketball for Eastern Oregon Normal School in La Grande. After two years, he transferred to the University of Oregon in Eugene, and was a  forward for the Ducks under head coach Howard Hobson.

High school coach
Anderson earned his bachelor's degree in 1941 at age twenty, and was in graduate school in Eugene when he accepted his first head coaching job at Baker High School in eastern Oregon that October.

He served as an officer in the U.S. Army Air Forces in World War II and returned to Baker in 1945, then moved to western Oregon at Medford in 1946 and Grants Pass in 1947. His 1950 team was state runner-up and he had a career prep record of  prior to taking the Gonzaga job in April 1951 at age thirty.

College coach and administrator
The program elevated to NCAA Division I in 1958, joined the Big Sky Conference as a charter member in 1963, and opened the on-campus Kennedy Pavilion in 1965. Anderson was Big Sky coach of the year in 1966, and stepped down as AD in 1972, then surprisingly left several weeks later to become head coach at Montana State in Bozeman, a conference rival. He spent two seasons at MSU, then departed for another Big Sky school in 1974 to become the athletic director at Northern Arizona in Flagstaff. Anderson oversaw the building of the Walkup Skydome and was also on the board of directors of the Fiesta Bowl in Tempe; he stayed at NAU nearly a decade and retired at the end of 1983 at age 63.

Later life
Anderson then moved to Las Vegas in 1984 to work in minor league baseball for the Las Vegas Stars.  The team, formerly the Spokane Indians from 1973 to 1982, was headed by Larry Koentopp, the former Gonzaga baseball coach hired by Anderson in 1969 and his successor as GU athletic director in 1972.

Anderson and his wife Betty, married in 1943, later retired to Gig Harbor, Washington.
He died in September 2005 at age 84 of an aortic aneurysm in Gig Harbor.

College head coaching record

References

External links
 Sports Reference – coaching record – Hank Anderson
 Gonzaga University Digital Collections – Hank Anderson

1920 births
2005 deaths
American men's basketball coaches
American men's basketball players
Basketball coaches from Oregon
Basketball players from Oregon
College men's basketball head coaches in the United States
Eastern Oregon Mountaineers men's basketball players
Forwards (basketball)
Gonzaga Bulldogs athletic directors
Gonzaga Bulldogs men's basketball coaches
High school basketball coaches in Oregon
Montana State Bobcats men's basketball coaches
Northern Arizona Lumberjacks athletic directors
Oregon Ducks men's basketball players
People from Gig Harbor, Washington
People from Harney County, Oregon
People from Milton-Freewater, Oregon
United States Army Air Forces officers
United States Army Air Forces personnel of World War II
Military personnel from Oregon